Margaret Morel (born 19 February 1958) is a Seychellois middle-distance runner. She competed in the women's 800 metres at the 1980 Summer Olympics. She was the first woman to represent the Seychelles at the Olympics.

References

1958 births
Living people
Athletes (track and field) at the 1980 Summer Olympics
Seychellois female middle-distance runners
Olympic athletes of Seychelles
Place of birth missing (living people)